Aslan Duz Rural District was formerly in Aslan Duz District of Parsabad County, Ardabil province, Iran. At the census of 2006, its population was 15,324 in 2,807 households; there were 16,116 inhabitants in 3,848 households at the following census of 2011; and in the most recent census of 2016, the population of the rural district was 17,709 in 4,713 households. The largest of its 54 villages was Aq Qabaq-e Sofla, with 872 people.

References 

Parsabad County

Rural Districts of Ardabil Province

Populated places in Ardabil Province

Populated places in Parsabad County